George Polk (October 17, 1913 – May 1948) was an American journalist for CBS who was murdered during the Greek Civil War, in 1948.

World War II
During World War II, Polk enlisted with a Naval Construction Battalion. After the invasion of Guadalcanal, the first element of Construction Unit Base 1 (CUB-1), an advance fuel and supply base, landed on August 16, 1942. This element was commanded by Ensign George W. Polk, USNR, and consisted of five officers and 118 enlisted personnel, all navy petty officers of aviation support ratings. CUB-1 later received a Presidential Unit Citation for its service. Polk also performed duty as a "volunteer" dive bomber and reconnaissance pilot. He was wounded, suffered from malaria and was hospitalized for almost a year.

Greek Civil War
Polk was found dead near the Port of Thessaloniki on Sunday May 16, 1948, shot at point-blank range in the back of the head, and with hands and feet tied.

Polk had been covering the Greek Civil War in Greece between the Greek government and communists trying to seize control of the country. His intention was to meet the military leader of the communists, Markos Vafeiadis, for an interview.

In his articles, he had alleged that a few officials in the Greek government had embezzled $250,000 in foreign aid ($2.5 million in 2016 dollars) from the Truman Administration, a charge that was never proved. Polk, sympathetic to the communists, had been particularly outspoken in his criticism of the Truman government's unqualified support for resistance by the "rightist authoritarian regime" in Greece to the communist attempt to seize power.

In the late 1970s, the story emerged as to how AMAG (American Mission for Aid to Greece) authorities helped the Greek Police frame two young communists for his death. 

A communist journalist, Gregorios Staktopoulos, was tried and convicted of helping Vaggelis Vasvanas and Adam Mouzenidis, members of the illegal communist army, commit the murder. The communist guerilla radio station said that Adam Mouzenidis was already dead, having been killed in an aerial bombing by the Hellenic Air Force, when Polk was murdered. Staktopoulos himself maintained that the confession that led to his conviction was obtained through torture.  In fact, it was later revealed that Mouzenidis had arrived at Salonica, where he was allegedly introduced to Polk, two days after Polk's murder, and Vasvanas was not in Greece at the time.  An investigation by James G. M. Kellis (also known as Killis), a former OSS officer with knowledge of Greek political circles and power brokers, concluded that Greek communist circles lacked the power and influence to commit the murder and cover it up. Kellis worked on contract for the Wall Street law firm of William 'Wild Bill' Donovan, the former head of OSS, who was hired by journalist Walter Lippman to investigate the case. Following Kellis' conclusion that it was more likely Polk had been murdered by right-wing groups within or affiliated to the Greek government, the investigation was halted and Kellis recalled to Washington. At the time the US government was financially supporting the Greek government to prevent a communist take-over of the country. The British government had supported the Greek government throughout 1941–1945, but this became a financial impossibility after the war.

Polk had married Rea Coccins (also known as Rhea Kokkonis), a Greek national and ex-stewardess, seven months prior to his death.  They had no children.  After being allegedly harassed and threatened by the Greek government, Rea fled to the U.S. where she was debriefed by Donovan's law firm. She became friendly with Barbara Colby, the wife of William Colby, a former OSS officer attached to Donovan's firm, who later would become director of the CIA.

Reporters in New York city started a fundraising project to send an independent investigation committee to Greece, and from this effort the newsmen's commission was formed. Members included Ernest Hemingway, William Polk (George Polk's brother), William A. Price (Polk's cousin) and Homer Bigart. This was soon however eclipsed in media coverage by the Lippman Committee, consisting mostly of Washington journalists with Walter Lippman as chairman and James Reston of The New York Times.

Within months of his death, a group of American journalists created the George Polk Awards for outstanding radio or television journalism.  These awards were modeled after the Pulitzer Prize which is awarded for outstanding print journalism in newspapers.

Criticism
In February 2007, Polk's "status as a symbol of journalistic integrity" was challenged by historian Richard Frank, who concluded that Polk made false claims about his service record in World War II. Frank examined the claim, repeated by Edward R. Murrow, that Polk had commanded a unit of 119 marines on Guadalcanal, flew a fighter plane that shot down 11 Japanese aircraft and won a Purple Heart. He concluded that it is not consistent with the available documentation. Frank said that "the inescapable conclusion is that George Polk did not simply verbally recount false tales of his wartime exploits to his family and to his journalist colleagues, he actually forged documents to buttress his stories."

George Polk's brother, William, replied to this attack, which he called slanderous, in a letter to The Guardian Monday March 19, 2007.  He pointed out that Frank did not discuss a single article Polk ever wrote and that his military record is amply substantiated in a range of military documents, including a picture of Polk being decorated by Vice-Admiral John McCain on November 30, 1943, on behalf of the "Airplane Cruiser Detachment ... for their heroic role during the Battle for the Solomons."

In April 2007, Frank responded to William Polk's letters and to what he considered a baffling silence from journalists that greeted his charges.

U.S. Postal stamp

On October 5, 2007, the United States Postal Service announced that it would honor five journalists of the 20th century times with first-class rate postage stamps, to be issued on Tuesday, April 22, 2008: Martha Gellhorn, John Hersey, George Polk, Rubén Salazar, and Eric Sevareid. Postmaster General Jack Potter announced the stamp series at the Associated Press Managing Editors Meeting in Washington.

Polk was related to US Presidents James Knox Polk and Andrew Jackson.
George Polk grew up in Fort Worth, Texas. He was a 1938 graduate of the University of Alaska.

See also 
George Polk Awards
Cold War
Greek Civil War
William Joseph Donovan
Walter Lippman
Frank Polk

References

Further reading
 Prados, John (2003). Last Crusader: The Secret Wars Of CIA Director William Colby. Oxford University Press. .
 Bernhard, Nancy E (1999). U.S. Television News and Cold War Propaganda, 1947-1960. Cambridge University Press.
 Keeley, Edmund (1989). The Salonika Bay Murder: Cold War Politics and the Polk Affair. Princeton University Press, Princeton, New Jersey.
 Marton, Kati (1990). The Polk Conspiracy: Murder and Cover-Up in the Case of CBS News Correspondent George Polk. Farrar Straus and Giroux, New York.
 Unger, Sanford (1990). "The Case of the Inconvenient Correspondent", Columbia Journalism Review 29 (November/December 1990).
 Vlanton, Elias, and Zak Mettger (1996). Who Killed George Polk? The Press Covers Up a Death in the Family. Temple University Press, Philadelphia, Pennsylvania.

External links 
 Seattle.indymedia.org at seattle.indymedia.org
 Who Killed George Polk? at www.vlanton.com
 http://www.routledge-ny.com/radio/polk.pdf
 Democracy Now! | The Story of George Polk at www.democracynow.org
 https://web.archive.org/web/20050208091654/http://dlib.nyu.edu:8083/tamwagead/servlet/SaxonServlet?source=%2Fnewsmens.xml&style=%2Fsaxon01t2002.xsl&part=body 
 https://www.researchgate.net/publication/281592670_Criminologistic_Analysis_of_The_Assassination_of_George_Washington_Polk
George Polk case National Security Archive
George Polk

1913 births
1948 deaths
American male journalists
CBS News people
Journalists killed while covering military conflicts
Deaths by firearm in Greece
People from Fort Worth, Texas
People murdered in Greece
American people murdered abroad
Assassinated American journalists
20th-century American non-fiction writers
Journalists from Texas
20th-century American male writers
1948 murders in Greece
Modern history of Thessaloniki
20th-century American journalists
Polk family